Elodina is a genus of butterflies in the family Pieridae. It is the only genus of the tribe Elodinini. It contains about 30 species.

Species
Elodina andropis Butler, 1876
Elodina angulipennis (Lucas, 1852)
Elodina anticyra (Fruhstorfer, 1910)
Elodina argypheus Grose-Smith, 1890
Elodina aruensis Joicey & Talbot, 1922
Elodina biaka  Joicey & Noakes, 1915
Elodina claudia De Baar & Hancock, 1993
Elodina denita Joicey & Talbot, 1916 (or Elodina definita)
Elodina dispar Röber, 1887
Elodina effeminata (Fruhstorfer, 1910)
Elodina egnatia Godart
Elodina hypatia (C. & R. Felder, 1865)
Elodina invisiblis Fruhstorfer
Elodina leefmansi Kalis, 1933
Elodina namatia Fruhstorfer, 1910
Elodina padusa (Hewitson, 1853)
Elodina parthia (Hewitson, 1853)
Elodina perdita Miskin, 1889
Elodina primularis Butler, 1882
Elodina pseudanops Butler, 1882
Elodina pura Grose-Smith, 1895
Elodina queenslandica De Baar & Hancock, 1993
Elodina signata Wallace, 1867
Elodina sota Eliot, 1956
Elodina therasia C. & R. Felder, [1865]
Elodina tongura Tindale, 1923
Elodina umbratica Grose-Smith, 1889
Elodina velleda Felder
Elodina walkeri  Butler, 1898

References

 
Pieridae genera
Taxa named by Rudolf Felder
Taxa named by Baron Cajetan von Felder